The Provincial Disaster Management Authority is an agency of the Government of Balochistan to deal with both natural and manmade disasters. It was formed after the promulgation of the NDMA Act 2010. The Authority coordinates and collaborates to prevent and minimize damage to life, infrastructure, and environment.

Provincial Emergency Operation Center (PEOC) 
Operation Center coordinates between provincial government and district administration in times of emergency.

District Disaster Management Authority (DDMA) 
In all the districts of Balochistan, DDMAs are established which consist of District administration officials including police and health department.

See also 
 2011 Balochistan floods
 2011 Balochistan earthquake
 National Disaster Management Authority (Pakistan)
 Provincial Disaster Management Authority (Khyber Pakhtunkhwa)
 Provincial Disaster Management Authority (Punjab)
 Provincial Disaster Management Authority (Sindh)
 State Disaster Management Authority (Azad Jammu & Kashmir)
 Gilgit-Baltistan Disaster Management Authority

References

External links
 Official website

Emergency management in Pakistan
Government agencies of Balochistan, Pakistan